The discography of American funk group Vulfpeck currently consists of six studio albums, 42 singles, one live album, four extended plays, seven compilation albums (with two containing all-original material) and one silent album. The band have released their music independently through their label Vulf Records since 2011.

From 2011 to 2014, the band released four EPs consecutively and further released a Spotify-exclusive silent album titled Sleepify to exploit a loophole with the streaming services' distribution of royalties. Their debut studio album, Thrill of the Arts, was released in 2015 and debuted at number 16 on the Billboard R&B Albums chart. The Beautiful Game followed almost exactly a year later in 2016, and Mr Finish Line in 2017 – the latter notable for its prolific featured artist line-up. Following Hill Climber in 2018, the band headlined a sold-out concert at Madison Square Garden which was recorded and released as their first live album in December 2019. It was the first time the venue had been sold out by an independent artist. The band's fifth album, The Joy of Music, the Job of Real Estate contains five previously released tracks as well as a track by Earthquake Lights, who won Vulfpeck's auction for rights to track 10.

The band released six compilation albums under the Vulf Vault header from 2020 to 2022, with each one focusing on a different band member. However, the latter two records uniquely contain all-new material, and were not released under Vulfpeck, but rather under the respective band member's name. After a brief hiatus, the band released their sixth studio album, Schvitz, on December 30.

Albums

Studio albums

Live albums

Compilation albums

Albums with previously-released material

Albums with all-new material

Other releases

Extended plays

Singles 

Notes

 This list of singles does not contain tracks released after their respective albums' release.
 This list does not include tracks from side projects (e.g. Here We Go Jack or Wong's Cafe)

References 

Discographies
Funk music discographies